The first season of The Masked Singer Australia premiered on Monday 23 September 2019 on Network 10 and is hosted by Osher Günsberg. In the Grand Finale on 21 October 2019, it was announced that the winner was Cody Simpson (who competed as “Robot”), the runner-up Rob Mills (who competed as “Wolf), and the third place finisher was Gorgi Coghlan (who competed as “Monster”).

The show involved 10 episodes and was filmed at Fox Studios Australia.

Production
The costumes were designed and created by Australian Academy Award and BAFTA Award-Winning costume designer Tim Chappel, who is best known for his work on The Adventures of Priscilla, Queen of the Desert with Lizzy Gardiner.

The winner, Cody Simpson, received the highest combined audience and panellist votes thereby winning the show.

Panellists and host

Following the announcement of the series, it was confirmed by Network 10 that the judging panel would consist of radio personality Jackie O, singer-songwriter Dannii Minogue, international actress and singer-songwriter Lindsay Lohan and comedian Dave Hughes. It was also confirmed that Osher Günsberg would host the show.

Throughout the season, guest panellists appeared as a fifth judge on the judging panel. The guest panellists in the first season were comedians Nazeem Hussain (episode 4) and Luke McGregor (episode 5).

Contestants
In the first season, there were 12 competitors in the competition. Before the season began, Ten released clues that it included ARIA Music Awards winners, an MTV Award winner, Logie Awards winner, 'Hall of Famers', an Order of Australia recipient and a World Cup winner.

Episodes

Episode 1 (23 September)

Episode 2 (24 September)

Episode 3 (30 September)

Episode 4 (1 October)

Episode 5 (7 October)
 Group number: "Me!" by Taylor Swift

Episode 6 (8 October)
 Group number: "So Am I" by Ava Max

Episode 7 (14 October)

Episode 8 (15 October)

Episode 10 (21 October) — Finale
 Group number: "This is Me" by Keala Settle, Benj Pasek & Justin Paul

Controversy
Independent music group Halocene purported that the Lion's (Kate Ceberano) rendition of "Bad Guy" in episode 3 was "virtually identical" to their own original cover and arrangement of the song. Ceberano received backlash on social media, after which it was clarified that she did not choose the arrangement, only the song.

Reception

Ratings

See also

List of Australian television series
The Masked Singer franchise
It Takes Two

References

External links
 
 
 

The Masked Singer (Australian TV series)
2019 Australian television seasons